This page lists notable alumni, students, and faculty of the University of California, Hastings College of the Law, a public law school in San Francisco, California.

Alumni

Notable alumni include:
 Dick Ackerman (1967) – California State Senate Republican Leader
 Jeff Adachi (1985) – Public Defender of San Francisco
 Jeffrey Amestoy (1972) – 40th Chief Justice of the Vermont Supreme Court
Joseph M. Azam (2008) — Senior Vice President, Global Chief Compliance & Ethics Officer for Infor (Former SVP & Group Chief Compliance Officer for News Corp)
 Nestor Barrero (1984) – Former Vice -Employment Law for NBCUniversal
 Marvin Baxter (1966) – Associate Justice of the California Supreme Court
 Joseph T. Bockrath – Professor of Law at LSU Law Center
 Michael Bradbury (1967) – former District Attorney of Ventura County, California
 Lloyd Braun (1983) – former media executive with Yahoo!, former chairman of the American Broadcasting Company Entertainment group
 Matthew Broad (1984) – Senior Vice President, General Counsel & Corporate Secretary, Darden Restaurants (Former Exec. VP and General Counsel for OfficeMax Incorporated)
 Willie Brown (1958) – 58th Speaker of the California State Assembly and 41st Mayor of San Francisco
 Melvin Brunetti (1964) – Senior Circuit Judge of the U.S. Court of Appeals for the Ninth Circuit
 Richard Bryan (1963) – former U.S. Senator and 25th Governor of Nevada
 Cynthia Bryant (1995) – former Director and Chief Deputy Director, Policy of the California Department of Finance, former Deputy Chief of Staff, Office of Governor Arnold Schwarzenegger
 Ed Case (1981) – U.S. Congressman from Hawaii's 2nd Congressional District
 Suzanne Case (1983) – Chairperson, Hawai'i Department of Land and Natural Resources, former Executive Director of The Nature Conservancy in Hawai'i
 Stephen H. Cassidy (1989) – Mayor of San Leandro, California 
 Rachelle Chong (1984) – first Asian American Federal Communications Commission Commissioner (President Clinton appointee), first Asian American Commissioner of the California Public Utilities Commission (Governor Schwarzenegger appointee), former General Counsel for Broadband Office and Sidecar
 James M. Cole (1979) – 35th United States Deputy Attorney General
 Carol Corrigan (1975) – Associate Justice of the California Supreme Court
 Joseph Cotchett (1964) – Founding Partner of Cotchett, Pitre & McCarthy, LLP, Attorney for Valerie Plame and the NFL, named "Titan of the Plaintiff's Bar" by Law360
 Charles F. Creighton ( ? ) – Attorney General of the Hawaiian Kingdom 
 Bill Dannemeyer (1952) – U.S. Congressman from California's 39th Congressional District (Orange County)
 Christopher Darden (1980) – prosecutor in O. J. Simpson murder case
 Mabel Craft Deering
 Sanford Diller (1927) – American real estate developer
 Scott Drexel (1975) – former Chief Prosecutor, State Bar of California
 Sidney M. Ehrman (1897) – Co-Founder and Name Partner of former international law firm Heller Ehrman LLP
 Sean Elsbernd (2000) – Member, San Francisco Board of Supervisors, 2004–2013
 Clair Engle (1933) – U.S. Senator from California
 Sam Fernandez (1980) – Senior Vice President and General Counsel for the Los Angeles Dodgers
 Sean Faircloth (1986) – Maine House Majority Whip, Executive Director Secular Coalition for America
 Clara Shortridge Foltz (1881) – first practicing female lawyer in the United States
 Philip Kan Gotanda (1978) – playwright
 Abby Ginzberg (1975) – documentary filmmaker
 Karla Gray (1976) – 14th Chief Justice of the Montana Supreme Court
 Amanda Grove (1990) – former Court TV anchor
 Terence Hallinan (1964) – 26th San Francisco District Attorney
 Kamala Harris (1990) – 49th Vice President of the United States
 Emanuel S. Heller (1889) – Founder and Name Partner of former international law firm Heller Ehrman LLP
 Robert Hertzberg (1979) – 64th Speaker of the California State Assembly and California State Senator
 William W. Hodgman (1978) - prosecutor in O. J. Simpson murder case
 Dennis Holahan (1973) – actor and entertainment lawyer, partner of Lewis Brisbois Bisgaard & Smith
 William Robert Holcomb (1950) – longest-serving mayor of San Bernardino, California
 Michael Huttner (1995) – progressive activist and founder of ProgressNow
 Vicki Iovine (1980) – Playboy Playmate, author
 Gregg Jarrett (1980) – Anchor, Fox News Channel
 Nick Jones (2007) – Grandson of "Deep Throat" Mark Felt, responsible for coordinating revelation of Deep Throat's identity to the media
 Sherwood "Shakey" Johnson – Founder of Shakey's Pizza
 Michael John Kennedy – prominent criminal defense and civil rights lawyer and activist
 Robert Krimmer – Former actor, now attorney
 Christine la Barraque – first blind woman admitted to the bar in California
 Howard Lachtman – Literary critic, Los Angeles Times, San Francisco Examiner 
 Jacqueline Lee (2006) - General Counsel of Flynn Restaurant Group
 Otto Lee (1994) – Mayor of Sunnyvale, California
 Frank D.G. Madison (1892) – Name Partner of Pillsbury Madison and Sutro, now Pillsbury Winthrop Shaw Pittman LLP
 John Matta (1977) – CEO of Wizard World and former Senior Vice President and General Counsel for Warner Bros. Studios
 Wiley Manuel (1953) – Associate Justice of the California Supreme Court and first African American California Supreme Court Justice
 Robert Matsui (1966) – U.S. Congressman from California's 5th Congressional District (Sacramento)
 Edward J. McCutchen (1879) – Founder and Name Partner of former international law firm Bingham McCutchen LLP (formerly McCutchen, Doyle, Brown & Enersen)
 Rodney Melville – California Judge, notable for presiding over the People v. Jackson'' case
 Thomas Mesereau (1979) – Criminal defense attorney with celebrity client list, including Michael Jackson and Robert Blake
 Alexander Morrison (1881) – Founder of the international law firm Morrison & Foerster LLP (also member of UC Hasting's first graduating class)
 George Moscone (1957) – Mayor of San Francisco, assassinated in 1978
 Paula A. Nakayama (1979) – Associate Justice of the Hawaii Supreme Court
 Andrew Downey Orrick (1947) – former Acting Chairman of the U.S. Securities and Exchange Commission and son of William Horsley Orrick, Sr. of Orrick, Herrington & Sutcliffe
 Charles (Chip) Pashayan (1968) – U.S. Congressman from 1979 to 1991 for California's 17th Congressional District
 Horace Davis Pillsbury (1896) – General Counsel & President, Pacific Bell; Son of Evans Searle Pillsbury of Pillsbury Winthrop Shaw Pittman LLP
 Richard W. Pollack – Associate Justice of the Hawaii Supreme Court
 Mario R. Ramil (1975) – Associate Justice of the Hawaii Supreme Court
 George R. Roberts (1969) – co-founder of Kohlberg Kravis & Roberts Company
 Robert Rigsby (1986) - Associate Justice of the D.C. Superior Court, former Attorney General for the District of Columbia, former Assistant U.S. Attorney for the Eastern District of Virginia, U.S. Army Colonel, Bronze Star Recipient, former JAG and Military Judge
 James David Santini (1962) – U.S. Congressman from Nevada
 Kevin Shelley (1980) – 28th California Secretary of State
 Douglas W. Shorenstein, real estate developer and former chairman of the board of directors of the Federal Reserve Bank of San Francisco
 Jackie Speier (1976) – U.S. Congresswoman
 Todd Spitzer (1989) – California State Assemblyman, Orange County District Attorney
 J. Christopher Stevens (1989) former U.S. Ambassador to Libya
 Alfred Sutro (1894) – Name Partner of Pillsbury Madison and Sutro, now Pillsbury Winthrop Shaw Pittman LLP
 Timothy Tau (2007) - Award-winning fiction writer and filmmaker
 Nancy Tellem (1979) – Entertainment and Digital Media President of Microsoft and former CBS Entertainment President
 Richard Thalheimer (1974) – founder and CEO of The Sharper Image
 Tom Umberg (1980) – California State Senator
 Ann Veneman (1976) – 27th U.S. Secretary of Agriculture, Executive Director of UNICEF
 Michael Wood (1979) – former CEO and founder of LeapFrog Enterprises

Faculty
Current
 Joseph Grodin
 Geoffrey Hazard
 Ugo Mattei
 Roger Park
 Veena Dubal

Former
 John Harmon Charles Bonté
 Miguel de Capriles

Sixty-Five Club
Some of the members of the UC Hastings Sixty-Five Club include
 Arthur Goldberg, Former U.S. Supreme Court Justice
 William Prosser, Torts
 Rudolf Schlesinger, International & Comparative Law
 Julius Stone, Jurisprudence & International Law
 Roger Traynor, Former California Supreme Court Justice

References

Hastings College of the Law